Ga Deuk-hee (born March 31, 1984) is a South Korean actress.

Television series

References

External links
 
 

1984 births
Living people
South Korean television actresses
Seoul Institute of the Arts alumni
Soju Ga clan